Charles Carnegie may refer to:

Charles Carnegie, 4th Earl of Southesk (1661–1699), Scottish nobleman
Charles Carnegie (politician) (1833–1906), MP for Forfarshire
Charles Carnegie, 10th Earl of Southesk (1854–1941), Scottish nobleman
Charles Carnegie, 11th Earl of Southesk (1893–1992)